Central Baldwin is a colloquial term referring to an area of Baldwin County, Alabama along Alabama State Highway 59. The area begins at the Interstate 10 exit in Loxley, Alabama including Robertsdale, Alabama and ending with Summerdale, Alabama. The unofficial boundary is generally considered to be the public school district served by Robertsdale High School. The term began to be used by most people in the area with the creation of Central Baldwin Middle School in the late 1990s. Although students in Summerdale attend Foley High School rather than Robertsdale High School it is generally considered a part of the Central Baldwin region.

Cities 
Central Baldwin is composed of four municipalities, Robertsdale, Loxley, Summerdale, and Silverhill (the only town that does not contain a section of Highway 59). Three smaller communities: Rosinton, Elsanor, and Seminole are also often included in the region.

Robertsdale serves as the "hub" of this region because it is the largest city and consists of many public works buildings. There is also a livestock auction, a large "feed and seed" store, and a rodeo venue to service the large farmlands of the region.

Loxley is becoming a popular location for the expansion of the suburbs from Daphne and Spanish Fort because it is serviced by an Interstate 10 exit and is almost directly in between the large cities of Mobile, Alabama and Pensacola, Florida. Loxley also has a large privately owned farmers' market that is popular among the locals and tourists traveling to the beach.

Media

Print
Robertsdale's The Independent is the primary newspaper read by the locals. The paper focuses on the Central Baldwin region.

Commerce 
Most of the businesses in Central Baldwin make a profit from tourists traveling to Gulf Shores and Orange Beach via Highway 59. This region is also where the Baldwin County Fair takes place.

External links
South Alabama Community Website
Baldwin County NOW

Regions of Alabama
Geography of Baldwin County, Alabama